libostree (previously OSTree) is a system for versioning updates of Linux-based operating systems. It can be considered as "Git for operating system binaries". It operates in userspace, and will work on top of any Linux file system. At its core is a Git-like content-addressed object store with branches (or "refs") to track meaningful file system trees within the store. Similarly, one can check out or commit to these branches.

Layered on top of that is bootloader configuration, management of /etc, and other functions to perform an upgrade beyond just replicating files.

It is used by endless OS, Flatpak, Fedora, CentOS, Atomic Host, and the GNOME continuous project for continuous delivery of GNOME components.

References

External links 
 
 

Computer libraries
Linux software